Association Sportive de Gien is a French association football club. They are based in the town of Gien and their home stadium is the Stade Municipal Wilson. As of the 2009–10 season, the club plays in the Division d'Honneur Regionale de Centre, the seventh tier of French football.

External links
AS Gien information at fff.fr 

Gien
1946 establishments in France
Association football clubs established in 1946
Sport in Loiret
Football clubs in Centre-Val de Loire